Brady Bluhm is an American actor. He played Christopher Robin in many Winnie the Pooh films. He has also played roles in Dumb and Dumber, its sequel Dumb and Dumber To, and the TV series Get a Life. Bluhm was a member of the Church of Jesus Christ of Latter-day Saints and served an LDS Mission in Concepción, Chile. Bluhm resides in Rancho Cucamonga, California with his wife, Abbie, their daughter, Faye, and their other children.

Filmography

Film

Main TV roles

Guest TV appearances

References

External links

Living people
Male actors from California
American male child actors
American male film actors
American male television actors
American male voice actors
People from San Bernardino County, California
20th-century American male actors
21st-century American male actors
Latter Day Saints from California
Year of birth missing (living people)